Purav Raja and Ramkumar Ramanathan were the defending champions but chose to defend their title with different partners. Raja partnered Jeevan Nedunchezhiyan but lost in the quarterfinals to Jay Clarke and Marc Polmans. Ramanathan partnered Saketh Myneni and successfully defended his title.

Myneni and Ramanathan won the title after defeating Hugo Grenier and Alexandre Müller 6–3, 6–2 in the final.

Seeds

Draw

References

External links
 Main draw

Bengaluru Open - Doubles
2022 Doubles